Carl Sebastian Martin Wery (born Wery de Lemans; 7 August 1897 in Trostberg, Upper Bavaria – 14 March 1975 in Munich) was a German actor.

Selected filmography 

 No Day Without You (1933)
 Anna and Elizabeth (1933) - Annas Vater
 Drei Kaiserjäger (1933) - Berghofer, Wirt
 The Royal Waltz (1935) - Brandmeyer
  (1937, Short) - Commodore Hardt (the film project had started in 1937; titled "Weltraumschiff 18")
 Water for Canitoga (1939) - Westbrook
 Fasching (1939) - Bildhauer Balthasar Huber
 Gold in New Frisco (1939) - McKinley
 The Eternal Spring (1940) - Sprecher der Bauern
 Enemies (1940) - Martin
 What Does Brigitte Want? (1941) - Generaldirektor Boller
 Venus on Trial (1941) - Der Oberstaatsanwalt
 Kameraden (1941) - General von York
 Alarmstufe V (1941)
 The Sold Grandfather (1942) - Vater Kreithofer
 The Little Residence (1942) - Dr. Werner
 A Salzburg Comedy (1943) - Der Tourist mit dem Fernglas
 Via Mala (1945) - Jonas Lauretz
 Frau Holle (1948)
 Tromba (1949) - Eric Jensen, Zirkusregisseur
  (1949) - Brandner Kaspar
 Dr. Holl (1951) - Alberti
 Bluebeard (1951) - Herzog
 In München steht ein Hofbräuhaus (1951) - Gustl Wurzinger
 Desires (1952) - Sanitätsrat Dr. Falkner
 Heidi (1952) - Dr. Classen
 The Great Temptation (1952) - Medizinalrat Dr. Bosch
 Have Sunshine in Your Heart (1953) - Der alte Grummel
 A Heart Plays False (1953) - Professor Linz
 Ave Maria (1953) - Dr. Melartin
 Love's Awakening (1953) - Urban, Töpfer
 Consul Strotthoff (1954) - Professor Wegener
 Columbus Discovers Kraehwinkel (1954) - Merzheim, Uhrmacher
 Bruder Martin (1954) - Pfarrer von Siebenwiesen
 Heidi and Peter (1955) - Dr. Classen
 Jackboot Mutiny (1955) - Generaloberst Fromm
 San Salvatore (1956) - Althoff, Schriftsteller
 Ballerina (1956) - Dr. Brinkmann
 Black Forest Melody (1956) - Stettner
 Without You All Is Darkness (1956) - Roberts Vater
 Nina (1956) - Hofrat Lorenz
 Der Meineidbauer (1956) - Mathias Ferner
 Die Christel von der Post (1956) - Egon Hanke, Kriminalkommissar
 Der Bauerndoktor von Bayrischzell (1957) - Dr. Sebastian Doppelsieder
 Meine schöne Mama (1958) - Stiefvater Tim
 Ein Amerikaner in Salzburg (1958) - Oreste Aldobrandini
 The Green Devils of Monte Cassino (1958) - Gen. Heidenreich
 The Elephant in a China Shop (1958) - Theodor Tanner, genannt TT
 Sebastian Kneipp (1958) - Sebastian Kneipp
 Nackt, wie Gott sie schuf (1958) - Pater Leonhard
 Court Martial (1959) - Stahmer sen.
 The Moralist (1959) - Krüger (uncredited)
 Arzt aus Leidenschaft (1959) - Professor Ruge
 Uncle Was a Vampire (1959) - Il professore tedesco
 A Summer You Will Never Forget (1959) - Fürst Aufenberger
 Stefanie in Rio (1960) - Pfarrer Don Nicolo
  (1960) - Nikolaos
 Mein Vaterhaus steht in den Bergen (1960) - Wilhelm von Hübner, Gutsbesitzer
 Frau Irene Besser (1961)
 Darling (1961) - Minister Mayer
 Trompeten der Liebe (1962) - Stadtpfarrer Ludwig
  (1964) - Joseph Semmelmeier
 Aunt Frieda (1965) - Hauptmann Joseph Semmelmaier (final film role)

Notes

External links
 
 

1890s births
1975 deaths
German male film actors
German male television actors
People from Traunstein (district)
20th-century German male actors